Garrison Cemetery is a cemetery located on the grounds of Fort Anne in Annapolis Royal, Nova Scotia, Canada. It is located next to the old Court House, at the intersection of George St. and Nova Scotia Trunk 1.

History 
Initially used as a burial ground for French military forces, it has since been used by Acadians, the British military and the parish of St. Lukes.  The earliest remaining tombstone is from 1720, that of Bethiah Douglass who died October 1, 1720, in her 37th year. The Douglass marker is the oldest English gravestone in Canada.

Rose Fortune (1774–1864), a Black Loyalist and the first female police officer in what is now Canada is buried here. The pioneering educator Andrew Henderson (1797–1869) was also buried there.

From plaque at cemetery:

Two cemeteries are located in this burial ground: the earlier Acadian parish cemetery and the later Church of England cemetery. The wooden markers once placed on most of the graves have long since decayed. The gravestones that remain represent only a small portion of the burials here.  Starting in the middle section, the Roman Catholic parish of St. Jean Baptiste located its cemetery in the area. Acadians from the Port-Royal French soldiers and administrators along with their families were buried here. There are no original signs of this cemetery visible.  When the British took the fort in 1710, they established a cemetery. This burial ground served the garrison and the Town of Annapolis Royal from 1710 until 1940.

Notable interments 

 Andrew Henderson
 John Robertson (Nova Scotia politician)
 William Robertson (Nova Scotia)
 John Ritchie (merchant)
 John Bernard Gilpin, son of William Gilpin (priest), and his family
 Peleg Wiswall

See also 
 Old Burying Ground (Halifax, Nova Scotia)
 Royal Navy Burying Ground (Halifax, Nova Scotia)
 Fort Moncton – oldest British military gravestones in region

References

External links
 Photographs on Flickr
 List of burials at Garrison Cemetery
 

Cemeteries in Nova Scotia
Buildings and structures in Annapolis County, Nova Scotia
Tourist attractions in Annapolis County, Nova Scotia